Rodion Gačanin (born 13 January 1967) is a Croatian association football coach.

Career
Gačanin started as a manager at local sides Orijent, Opatija and Crikvenica then worked in the UAE, Bahrain and Kuwait.

He has coached in the Middle East for decades and had been manager of Libyan side Al-Ahly Benghazi since September 2021, before returning to one of his former clubs, Kuwait SC, in July 2022.

Managerial statistics

Honours
Bahrain Riffa Club
Bahraini Premier League: 2002-03 2004-05
Bahraini FA Cup: 2004
Bahraini Crown Prince Cup: 2002, 2003, 2004

Al Kuwait Kaifan
Kuwaiti Premier League: 2005-06, 2006-07, 2007-08
Kuwait Crown Prince Cup: 2008

Al-Muharraq
Bahraini Premier League: 2010-11, 2014-15

Al Qadsia
Kuwaiti Premier League: 2011-12
Kuwait Emir Cup: 2011-12
Kuwait Super Cup: 2011

References

External links
 

1963 births
Living people
Sportspeople from Tuzla
Sportspeople from Rijeka
Croats of Bosnia and Herzegovina
Croatian football managers
HNK Orijent managers
Riffa SC managers
Kuwait SC managers
Kuwait national football team managers
Al Nassr FC managers
Al-Merrikh SC managers
Al-Muharraq SC managers
Qadsia SC managers
Erbil SC managers
Al-Nasr SC (Kuwait) managers
Mesaimeer SC managers
Al-Nasr S.C.S.C. managers
Al-Ahly SC (Benghazi) managers
Kuwait Premier League managers
Saudi Professional League managers
Oman Professional League managers
Croatian expatriate football managers
Expatriate football managers in Bahrain
Croatian expatriate sportspeople in Bahrain
Expatriate football managers in Kuwait
Croatian expatriate sportspeople in Kuwait
Expatriate football managers in Saudi Arabia
Croatian expatriate sportspeople in Saudi Arabia
Expatriate football managers in Sudan
Croatian expatriate sportspeople in Sudan
Expatriate football managers in Libya
Croatian expatriate sportspeople in Libya
Expatriate football managers in Iraq
Croatian expatriate sportspeople in Iraq
Expatriate football managers in Qatar
Croatian expatriate sportspeople in Qatar
Expatriate football managers in the United Arab Emirates
Croatian expatriate sportspeople in the United Arab Emirates
Expatriate football managers in Oman
Croatian expatriate sportspeople in Oman